are a Japanese rock and roll band and comedy group. The band formed as "Sons of Drifters" around 1956 from two bands "Mountain Boys" and "Tokyo Western Boys".

However, members in the group changed back and forth occasionally. Chosuke Ikariya became the group's leader in 1964. Although the band became famous as a comedy group under Ikariya, they took part in the Kōhaku Uta Gassen as a musical band for the first time in 2001. Ikariya died of lymph node cancer in 2004 at the age of 72.

The group is also known for its 40-second performance as an opening act for The Beatles' first ever concert in Japan.

Members 
 Chōsuke Ikariya — Leader, joined 1962 during the group's band era, died of lymph node cancer in 2004
 Cha Katō — Joined 1962
 Boo Takagi — Joined 1964
 Chū Arai — Joined 1964, left the group in 1974, died of liver failure in 2000
 Kōji Nakamoto — Joined 1965, died of acute subdural hematoma after suffering serious head injury from traffic collision in 2022
 Ken Shimura — Joined as an assistant member in 1968, became an official member 1974 (replacing Arai), he died from COVID-19 in 2020 
 Shinji Suwa — Joined as an assistant member in 1972, never an official member

Hachijidayo Zen'inshūgō!
They are most famous for the regular variety show , which aired on the TBS from 1969 to 1985 with a total of 803 episodes. It held the highest ratings of any program in its time, and still holds one of the highest program ratings in Japanese television history. Its low-brow humour and slapstick comedy made it popular with children much to the dismay of parents. The Candies were their co-stars during most of the 1970s.

The show itself was a comedy variety show that featured sketches and musical guests. Often the show opened with a long sketch that lasted for about 20–25 minutes and then musical guests were featured. The show would round out the hour with a few more sketches, often with the musical guests participating in these. 

Besides the regular weekly show, The Drifters, or "Dorifu" as they came to be called, would also have special presentations every few months. These specials would be an hour and a half and would consist of many short sketches. Often they would have special guests, usually famous singing performers, that would participate in the sketches but would not always sing during the show.

The show featured puppet caricatures of the Drifters as the principal characters while Pink Lady provided narration and the show's theme song, as well as insert songs based on their hit singles.

Solo projects
After Hachijidayo! ended in 1985, the group virtually disbanded but continued to get together for their occasional hour and a half specials. Shimura Ken teamed up with Cha Kato for the series Katochan Kenchan Gokigen TV (Fun TV with Kato-chan and Ken-chan). Nakamoto Koji became a regular on the TV program Toyamano Kinsan. Takagi Boo recorded a number of albums of Hawaiian style music.

After Katochan Kenchan Gokigen TV, Kato Cha became a regular on the program "Musashibo Benkei" and appeared as a special guest on other TV programs. After Katochan Kenchan Gokigen TV, Shimura Ken also starred in other TV shows such as "Shimura Ken no Bakatonosama" and "Shimuraken no Daijobuda" and guest starred on other TV shows.

In 1999, Chosuke Ikariya won the Japanese Academy Awards of Best Supporting Actor for his performance of Heihachiro Waku in the movie Bayside Shakedown. Chōsuke Ikariya died on March 20, 2004, at the age of 72 of cancer of the lymph nodes. He announced his illness in June of the previous year, and left the hospital once in July afterwards for the opening of the movie Bayside Shakedown 2.

In April 2002, Shimura Ken recorded a one-off single with Hello! They recorded two songs named after a catch phrase of his, "Ai-in".

See also
 Crazy Cats
 Kyu Sakamoto

References

External links 
  Ken Shimura's official page
 
  Official Agency Page
 Short online biography of the Drifters

1956 establishments in Japan
Japanese boy bands
Japanese comedy musical groups
Japanese comedy troupes
Japanese rock music groups
Performing groups established in 1956